Robert Barber (1749 in Kilkenny, Ireland – 1783) was a quartermaster on HMS Adventure during Captain Cook's Second Voyage 1772–1775. On 31 December 1772 he became an A.B. He was Master of HMS Mercury when he died.

References

1749 births
1783 deaths
Quartermasters
People from County Kilkenny
Royal Navy sailors